is the name of three train stations in Japan:

 Shimizu Station (Aichi)
 Shimizu Station (Osaka)
 Shimizu Station (Shizuoka)

See also
 Shin-Shimizu Station in Shimizu Ward, Shizuoka